"Something About You" is the debut single to be released by Christian Burns.

It was released via Data Records and Ministry of Sound on 25 August 2008.

Track listing

Promo CD
Something About You (MDE Extended Mix) (6:28) 
Something About You (Filthy Rich Remix) (7:07) 
Something About You (Dave Robertson's In One Remix) (6:50) 
Something About You (My Digital Enemy Remix) (7:44) 
Something About You (My Digital Enemy Dub) (7:48) 
Something About You (MDE Instrumental) (6:25) 
Something About You (Filthy Rich Instrumental) (7:05)

Promo 12" (1)
Something About You (J Majik & Wickaman Remix) (5:55)

Promo 12" (2)
Something About You (MDE Extended Mix)
Something About You (Filthy Rich Mix)
Something About You (My Digital Enemy Mix)
Something About You (Dave Robertson's In One Mix)

References

2008 singles
Christian Burns songs
2008 songs
Songs written by Curtis Frasca
Songs written by Christian Burns
Data Records singles
Ministry of Sound singles